A whoopie sling is an easily adjustable rope sling designed for tree pruning or tree removal. The whoopie sling works by wrapping the sling around the trunk of a tree or a heavy load bearing limb and pulling the end of the rope within the sling through a spliced choker. By adjusting the size of the eye in the rope through the choker the user is able to adjust the length of the sling constricting around the tree without needing knots.  It is also becoming more common (usually in smaller diameter) for suspending hammocks during hiking, camping, or sailing.

References

Horticulture
Forestry tools